Floris Jan Willem de Vries (born 18 August 1989) is a Dutch professional golfer.

Career
De Vries was born in Rheden and turned professional in 2009 having had a successful amateur career. He qualified for the Challenge Tour by finishing in the top five of the rankings on the EPD Tour, one of Europe's third tier development tours, in 2009.

In his rookie season on the Challenge Tour De Vries won the Mugello Tuscany Open, defeating Thorbjørn Olesen in a sudden-death playoff. He ended the season in 4th place on the Challenge Tour Rankings to graduate to the top level European Tour for 2011.

Amateur wins
2005 European Boys Championship, European Under 16 Championship
2006 French Boys Championship
2007 Dutch Amateur Open Championship
2008 Dutch Amateur Open Championship

Professional wins (3)

Challenge Tour wins (1)

Challenge Tour playoff record (1–0)

Pro Golf Tour wins (2)

Team appearances
Amateur

 European Boys' Team Championship (representing the Netherlands): 2003, 2004, 2005, 2007
European Youths' Team Championship (representing the Netherlands): 2006
Jacques Léglise Trophy (representing Continental Europe): 2005 (winners), 2007
Eisenhower Trophy (representing the Netherlands): 2008
European Amateur Team Championship (representing the Netherlands): 2008

See also
2010 Challenge Tour graduates

References

External links

Dutch male golfers
De Vries, Floris
People from Rheden
Sportspeople from Gelderland
Sportspeople from Apeldoorn
1989 births
Living people
21st-century Dutch people